Thomas Kempe (born 17 March 1960) is a German retired professional footballer who played as a defensive midfielder. His sons Dennis and Tobias are also professional footballers.

Career statistics

References

External links
 

1960 births
Living people
German footballers
Association football midfielders
Germany B international footballers
Germany under-21 international footballers
MSV Duisburg players
VfB Stuttgart players
VfL Bochum players
Bundesliga players
German football managers
Tauro F.C. managers
20th-century German people